Glenville is a community in the Canadian province of Nova Scotia, located in Cumberland County.

References

Glenville - Geographical Names Board of Canada

Communities in Cumberland County, Nova Scotia
General Service Areas in Nova Scotia